Delta IV is a group of five expendable launch systems in the Delta rocket family introduced in the early 2000s. Originally designed by Boeing's Defense, Space and Security division for the Evolved Expendable Launch Vehicle (EELV) program, the Delta IV became a United Launch Alliance (ULA) product in 2006. The Delta IV is primarily a launch vehicle for United States Air Force (USAF) military payloads, but has also been used to launch a number of United States government non-military payloads and a single commercial satellite.

The Delta IV originally had two main versions which allowed the family to cover a range of payload sizes and masses: the retired Medium (which had four configurations) and Heavy.  As of 2019, only the Heavy remains active, with payloads that would previously fly on Medium moving to either the existing Atlas V or the forthcoming Vulcan. Retirement of the Delta IV is anticipated in 2023.

Delta IV vehicles are built in the ULA facility in Decatur, Alabama. Final assembly is completed at the launch site by ULA: at the horizontal integration facility for launches from SLC-37B pad at Cape Canaveral and in a similar facility for launches from SLC-6 pad at Vandenberg Air Force Base.

Launch statistics

Launch Outcome

Launch Station

Rocket

Launch History

Upcoming launches 
The following missions have been announced by the National Reconnaissance Office. For the final five missions (12-16) including contract modifications, ULA has been awarded $2.2 billion, or $440 million per launch. This can be compared with the Falcon Heavy launch price of $90 million to $150 million. As of July 2021, these are the final missions:

Notes

References 

Lists of Delta launches
Lists of rocket launches